Qaraba (also Romanized as Qarābā and Qorābā’; also known as Kuraba) is a village in Ziabar Rural District, in the Central District of Sowme'eh Sara County, Gilan Province, Iran. At the 2006 census, its population was 684, in 211 families.

References 

Populated places in Sowme'eh Sara County